Đogani, formerly known as Giogani Fantastico, is a Serbian turbo-folk and Eurodance duo from Belgrade, founded in the early 90s. The group was originally composed of the married couple Đorđe Đogani and Slađana Delibašić. Following their divorce in 2001, Giogani Fantastico rebranded as Đogani, consisted of Đorđe Đogani and his new girlfriend, Vesna Trivić.

They have released twelve studio albums to date, as well as numerous standalone singles and EPs. Some of best known songs of Đogani include: "Idemo na Mars" (1994), "Leto je" (1995), "Čekaj me kod kolima" (2005), "Znam ja", "Nema više cile mile" (2007) featuring Mile Kitić, "Gljiva ludara", "Ajmo sad u provod" (2009) and "Srce mi je zastalo" (2013).

The duo has also been associated with Đogani's brothers Andrija Đogani - Baki B3 and Gagi Đogani from Funky G.

Discography 
As Giogani Fantastiko 
 Storm (1992)
 Idemo na Mars (1994)
 Pronađi sebe  (1996)
 Granice nema (1997)
 Bensedin (1998)
 Da, to je to! (2000)

As Đogani
 Novi dan (2001)
 Dok ja ljubim (2003)
 Đogani (2005)
 Ljubav moja (2007)
 Svila (2009)
 Đogani (2015)

External links 
 
  - Magazine "Zdravo", May 1981.

References 

Serbian pop-folk music groups
Beovizija contestants